Fernshaw is a bounded rural locality in Victoria, Australia, on Acheron Way between Marysville to the north and Warburton to the south, located within the Shire of Yarra Ranges local government area.

History
Fernshawe Post Office opened on 19 September 1865 and closed in 1890.

References

Towns in Victoria (Australia)
Yarra Ranges